Tubby Creek is a stream in the U.S. state of Mississippi.

Tubby is a name derived from the Chickasaw language purported to mean either "to kill" or "white".

References

Rivers of Mississippi
Rivers of Benton County, Mississippi
Mississippi placenames of Native American origin